Donald Kummings (July 28, 1940 - November 10, 2017) was an American professor, poet and scholar of literature, best remembered for his research on poet Walt Whitman. For 36 years he served as a professor of English at University of Wisconsin–Parkside.

Early life and education 
Donald Kummings was born in 1940 to Estelle and Herman Kummings in Lafayette, Indiana.

Kummings earned his B.A. in creative writing from Purdue University in 1962, following with M.A. in English in 1964 from the same university. In 1971 he earned
Ph.D. in English and American Studies from Indiana University.

Teaching 
Donald Kummings taught for more than 43 years. He started his teaching career as a teaching assistant at Purdue University in 1963. He also taught at Adrian College and Indiana University before coming to Parkside in 1970. Kummings retired in 2006 as a professor of English at University of Wisconsin–Parkside.

He was a co-organizer of the Parkside’s Foreign Film Series for 35 years.

Donald Kummings earned a number of teaching awards for his contributions in the university, culminating with the Wisconsin Professor of the Year from the Carnegie Foundation for the Advancement of Teaching in 1997.

Bibliography

Books on Walt Whitman 
Kummings published four books on Walt Whitman:

 Walt Whitman, 1940-1975: A Reference Guide (Boston: G.K.Hall & Co., 1982. xiv, 264 pp.) 
 Approaches to Teaching Whitman’s “Leaves of Grass” (New York: Modern Language Association of America, 1990. x, 192 pp.) 
 Walt Whitman: An Encyclopedia (Co-editor, with J.R. LeMaster. New York and London: Garland Publishing. 1998. Xxxii, 847 pp.) . In 2010 this book became available online at the Walt Whitman Archive (www.whitmanarchive.org). In 2011 it was reissued under the title The Routledge Encyclopedia of Walt Whitman 
 A Companion to Walt Whitman (Oxford, England and Malden, Massachusetts: Blackwell Publishers, 2006. xvi, 607 pp.) . In 2007 the book became part of a multi-volume Electronic Resource: Blackwell Reference Online. In 2009 it was reissued in a paperback edition

Poems 
Throughout his life Kummings also wrote his own poems. In 1989 he published a collection of 20 poems 
The Open Road Trip (Tunnel, New York: Geryon Press, Limited, 1989. 36 pp.) , in which he explored his intimate and travel experiences. The book was awarded the Posner Poetry Prize by the Council for Wisconsin Writers.

Selected articles and reviews 
Some of Donald Kummings' shorter publications on American literature:

 “Babette Deutsch,” “Richard Hovey,” and “Edwin Markham.” Encyclopedia of American Literature.” Ed. Steven R. Serafin. New York: Continuum, 1999, pp. 266-267, 540-541, 719-720.
 “Henry Deringer,” “Eliphalet Remington,” and “Oliver Fisher Winchester.” Violence in America: An Encyclopedia. 3 Vols. Ed. Ronald Gottesman. New York: Charles Scribner’s Sons, 1999, Vol.1 pp. 392-393; Vol. 3, pp. 39, 449.
 “[American] Poetry.” The Oxford Companion to United States History. Ed. Paul Boyer. New York: Oxford University Press, 2001, pp. 601-603.
 “Literature,” “Twain, Mark (1835-1910),” Whitman, Walt (1819-1892),” Encyclopedia of the Gilded Age and Progressive Era. 3 Vols. Edited by John D. Buenker and Joseph Buenker. Armonk, New York: M.E. Sharpe, 2005, Vol.1, pp. 134–140; Vol. 3, pp. 972–973, 1022.

References

External links 
 Donald D. Kummings website archived

1940 births
2017 deaths
Writers from Wisconsin
Indiana University alumni
Purdue University alumni
University of Wisconsin–Parkside faculty